Telfer Airport  is located at Telfer Mine, in the Pilbara region of Western Australia.

Airlines and destinations

Notes
  Fly-in fly-out (FIFO) private charter operations only.

See also
 List of airports in Western Australia
 Aviation transport in Australia

References

External links
 Airservices Aerodromes & Procedure Charts

Pilbara airports